Cape Bellue is a headland on the north side of the entrance to Darbel Bay, which forms the west extremity of Stresher Peninsula on the west coast of Graham Land, Antarctica. It separates Graham Coast to the northeast from Loubet Coast to the southwest.  Discovered by the French Antarctic Expedition, 1908–10, under Charcot, and named by him for Admiral Bellue, Superintendent of the Dockyard at Cherbourg, France. The cape was roughly mapped by BGLE in August-September 1935 and called in error "Cape Evensen". The cape was photographed from the air by FIDASE and surveyed from the ground by FIDS from Detaille Island, 1956-57

External links 
 Cape Bellue on USGS website
 Cape Bellue on AADC website
 Cape Bellue on SCAR website

References 

Headlands of Graham Land
Loubet Coast